Boshell's Mill is the historic site of a gristmill and sawmill on Lost Creek near Townley in rural Walker County, Alabama. The  site was listed on the National Register of Historic Places in 1975. It was recorded by the Historic American Engineering Record as part of the Birmingham District in 1992.

History

Boshell's Mill, one of several mills run by the Boshell family in Walker County, was started by William R. Boshell in 1885. It was initially a steam engine-powered sawmill only, with the creek used to transport logs to the mill. Boshell expanded the mill in 1901 with the addition of a dam built using locally quarried stone. It was completed in 1902. A gristmill was built on the opposite bank of the creek in 1903. Water turbines at each end of the dam supplied power to each mill.

The Boshell family operated the mills until 1963. It was listed on the National Register on May 30, 1975. A fire destroyed the sawmill building in 1976. Another fire destroyed the gristmill in 1986. The stone foundation piers and dam currently remain intact.

References

External links

Historic American Engineering Record (HAER) documentation, filed under Lost Creek at Alabama Route 124, 1.7 miles South of Route 78, Townley, Walker County, AL:

Industrial buildings completed in 1895
National Register of Historic Places in Walker County, Alabama
Industrial buildings completed in 1903
Grinding mills on the National Register of Historic Places in Alabama
Watermills in the United States
Grinding mills in Alabama
Sawmills in the United States
Historic districts in Walker County, Alabama
Historic districts on the National Register of Historic Places in Alabama
Historic American Engineering Record in Alabama